This is a list of cemeteries in Toronto.

See also
 List of cemeteries in York Region

References

 
Cemeteries
Toronto